Tomáš Hertl (born 12 November 1993) is a Czech professional ice hockey forward and alternate captain for the San Jose Sharks of the National Hockey League (NHL). Hertl was selected 17th overall in the 2012 NHL Entry Draft by the Sharks. He is the first player born in the modern Czech Republic after the dissolution of Czechoslovakia to appear in an NHL game.

Prior to being drafted, Hertl played for HC Slavia Praha of the Czech Extraliga.

Playing career

Early career
Hertl started his playing career with HC Slavia Praha in the Czech Extraliga, playing on the U18 and U20 squads in 2009–10. He was the third-highest scorer on the U20 team, scoring 12 goals and 26 assists. On the U18 team, Hertl scored 13 goals and 10 assists. The next season, Hertl was among four players on the U20 team with 40+ points; Hertl had 14 goals and 27 assists. In 2011–12, Hertl was the fourth-leading scorer for Slavia, with 11 goals and 15 assists.

The NHL Central Scouting Bureau ranked Hertl fifth among European skaters before the 2012 NHL Entry Draft. Sports Illustrateds Allan Muir ranked Hertl as the 18th best prospect in the 2012 draft. ISS Hockey listed Hertl as the 32nd best, while The Hockey News and TSN scout Craig Button listed him as the 24th and 22nd best player, respectively. Among Hertl's advantages include his large body and a good physical and defensive play, which Muir compared to Martin Hanzal. However, Muir also wrote, "Hertl's not the most agile skater or finisher, and he has a tendency to try to do too much." Button stated that Hertl, although not particularly fast, his agility compensates for his speed; Hertl is also an effective passer and when "given the opportunity to shoot, he can be dangerous."

Hertl was drafted by the San Jose Sharks with 17th overall pick in the 2012 draft, and became the first European player drafted with the Sharks' top pick since Czech Lukas Kaspar was drafted in 2004. After being drafted, Hertl rejoined Slavia, scoring 30 points in 43 games.

San Jose Sharks
The Sharks officially signed Hertl to a three-year entry-level contract on 3 June 2013. In the preseason, Hertl scored 3 goals and 1 assist, and joined Joe Thornton and Brent Burns on a line, filling the hole created by Raffi Torres' injury. Hertl made his NHL debut against the Vancouver Canucks on 3 October, 2013 and tallied his first career point with an assist on a goal by Brent Burns. At age 19, Hertl became the first teenager to play in a season opener for the Sharks since Marc-Édouard Vlasic in 2006. Hertl scored his first two NHL goals in the next game on 5 October 2013, against Mike Smith of the Phoenix Coyotes; Hertl became the youngest player to score 2 goals for the Sharks in one game since Patrick Marleau on 17 March 1999. On 8 October 2013, Hertl registered 4 goals against the New York Rangers in a 9–2 victory, making him the fourth youngest player in the NHL to record a four-goal game (19 years, 330 days old) after Jimmy Carson did in the 1987–88 NHL season with the Los Angeles Kings (19 years, 254 days old). Hertl also became the first Shark to score four goals in one game since Owen Nolan in 1995. Hertl was eventually named the October Rookie of the Month, scoring eight goals, which led all rookies, and 11 points in 13 games. However, on 19 December against the Kings, Hertl injured his knee after a collision with Dustin Brown, and was reported to miss at least a month. Hertl had surgery on his MCL and PCL in his right knee on 31 December. A former NHL trainer stated that the "best-case scenario" for Hertl's return was approximately twelve weeks, though Kevin Kurz of CSN Bay Area wrote that Hertl could be out for six to nine months. On 11 April 2014, Hertl was cleared to return to the Sharks against the Colorado Avalanche, ending a 45-game absence. On 17 April, against the Kings, Hertl scored his first career playoff goal.

On 29 June 2016, at the conclusion of his entry-level contract, Hertl agreed to a two-year $6 million extension to remain with the Sharks. He signed a four-year contract extension with the Sharks on 2 July 2018. During the 2018–19 season, Hertl posted 74	points in 77 games as the Sharks advanced to the 2019 Stanley Cup playoffs. The Sharks faced off against the Vegas Golden Knights in the first round and in Game 6 Hertl scored a short-handed goal in double overtime to force a Game 7, which the Sharks won 5–4 in overtime. Following this, the Sharks beat the Colorado Avalanche, also in seven games, before being defeated by the St. Louis Blues in the Western Conference Finals.

In January 2020, Hertl participated in the 2020 National Hockey League All-Star Game as an alternate following an injury to teammate Logan Couture; in the Pacific Division's 10–5 semifinal victory over the Central Division, Hertl became the first Sharks player to score four goals in an All-Star Game. On 29 January, he left the Sharks' game against the Canucks with what was revealed to be season-ending tears to the ACL and MCL.

On 16 March 2022, he signed an eight-year contract extension with the Sharks.

International play

Hertl joined the Czech Republic at the 2011 IIHF World U18 Championships, scoring 1 goal, as the team finished eighth. The next year, Hertl participated in the 2012 World Junior Ice Hockey Championships for the Czechs, scoring 3 goals and 2 assists, with the team finishing fifth. He eventually played in the 2013 edition, in which the Czech team finished fifth.

Hertl played with the Czech Republic at the 2013 IIHF World Championship, where he was the youngest player on the team. Due to the knee injury against the Kings in December 2013, Hertl was forced to have surgery and missed out on participating in the 2014 Sochi Olympics. Hertl returned to the Czech team for the 2015 IIHF World Championship.

Hertl was selected to play for the Czech Republic in the 2016 World Cup.

Personal life
In June 2019, Hertl married his fiance Aneta. On 1 July 2020, Hertl and his wife Aneta announced their first pregnancy.

Career statistics

Regular season and playoffs

International

Awards and honors

References

External links

1993 births
Living people
Czech expatriate ice hockey players in the United States
Czech ice hockey centres
HC Slavia Praha players
HC Slovan Ústečtí Lvi players
National Hockey League first-round draft picks
San Jose Sharks draft picks
San Jose Sharks players
Ice hockey people from Prague
Worcester Sharks players